Sir Charles John Curran (13 October 1921 – 9 January 1980) was an Irish-born British television executive and Director-General of the BBC from 1969 to 1977.

Early years
Curran was born in Dublin. His father, Felix Curran, was an army schoolmaster and his mother, Alicia Isabella Bruce, came from Aberdeen. Three weeks after his birth, the family moved to Aberdeen, then his family moved to Yorkshire in 1924. He was the eldest child in a family of four siblings. He attended Wath Grammar School, before obtaining a first-class honours degree at Magdalene College, Cambridge.

Career

He served in the Indian Army from 1942 to 1945, but left to work in the BBC Talks department. He resigned following a dispute to edit the Canadian Fishing News, but he returned in 1951 to join BBC Monitoring. Subsequent posts included Secretary and Director of External Broadcasting. While Director-General, he served three terms as President of the European Broadcasting Union. He succeeded Ronnie Waldman as Managing Director of the news agency Visnews in 1977.

He was Director-General of the BBC from 1 April 1969 to 30 September 1977. He was the first grammar school-educated Director-General.

Following the appointment of the former Conservative minister Lord Hill as Chairman of the BBC Governors in 1967 (ironically, the Labour Prime Minister who appointed Hill, Harold Wilson, had attacked Hill's appointment as chairman of the Independent Television Authority under a Conservative government in 1963), Curran's arrival marked a return to a more cautious approach after the radicalism of Sir Hugh Carleton Greene.

Curran also suffered criticism from Harold Wilson, at that time the Leader of the Opposition, who claimed that the documentary Yesterday's Men (1971) was biased against himself and the Labour Party, an assertion the BBC now accepts. A parallel documentary at the time on the Heath government passed without incident.

Unlike Greene, Curran allowed himself to be influenced by Mary Whitehouse. Curran issued an apology to Whitehouse after she complained about the violence at the end of part three of The Deadly Assassin (1976), a Doctor Who serial. Philip Hinchcliffe, then series producer, was replaced after only three more serials and his successor, Graham Williams, was ordered to lighten the tone and reduce the violence and horror content.

It was under Curran that the BBC produced some of its best-loved and most consistently repeated comedy series, such as Dad's Army, Porridge and the first series of Fawlty Towers.  Curran has often been blamed for an unenthusiastic and somewhat censorious attitude towards Monty Python's Flying Circus, but the Python team still won many of their battles with BBC officialdom. The Play for Today series continued to take risks throughout Curran's eight years as Director-General. The Morecambe and Wise Show became one of the best-loved British TV institutions ever between 1969 and 1977, and the Curran era also saw the development of Michael Parkinson's hugely popular Saturday-night chat show.

Knighthood and death
Curran was made a Knight Bachelor in 1974. Following a period of ill health, Curran died from a heart attack on 9 January 1980, aged 58. His funeral was held in Westminster Cathedral.

References

1921 births
1980 deaths
English male journalists
English television executives
BBC executives
Alumni of Magdalene College, Cambridge
People educated at Wath Academy
Knights Bachelor
International Emmy Directorate Award
English people of Scottish descent
Indian Army personnel of World War II
British Indian Army officers
European Broadcasting Union
20th-century English businesspeople
Irish emigrants to the United Kingdom
Directors-General of the BBC